The Twintech International University College of Technology, or Twintech for short, is a private publicly funded university college in Malaysia. The main campus is in Bandar Sri Damansara, Petaling District, Selangor.

Twintech International University College of Technology, formerly known as L&G-Twintech Institute of Technology, is a private institution of higher learning licensed by the Ministry of Education. The university college is owned and managed by Twintech Holding Sdn. Bhd.

The university was founded to provide training in the fields of Architecture & Built Environment, Business & Finance, Computer Science & Multimedia, Engineering & Industrial Technology, Biotechnology, Nursing & Health Science, Optometry, Education, Music & Performing Art.

Twintech started from a modest, rented premises in Setapak. Presently, it has three campuses at Bandar Sri Damansara, Kota Kinabalu, and Kota Bharu with facilities and amenities, including computing suites, engineering laboratories, architectural studios, and biotechnology laboratories.

Twintech has around 4,000 students studying local and overseas twinning programmes. Approximately 150 local and overseas full-time lecturers support the academic programmes at Twintech.

All programmes will be awarded internally; some will be quality-controlled by universities from United Kingdom and local universities. The university offers programme such B. Optometry (Hons), B. Nursing, B. Biotechnology and more. Over 61 programmes are under approval status, another 42 programmes are within provisional status and 24 programmes are fully accredited status with the MQA (Malaysian Qualifications Agency).

Bandar Sri Damansara is the main campus. The main campus is home for seven faculties: Engineering & Industrial Technology, Architecture & Build Environment, Nursing & Health Sciences, Computer Science & Multimedia, Education, Music & Performing Art. In the same location, there are Wisma Twintech home two faculties: Faculty of Optometry and Faculty of Biotechnology.

Faculties and centres
 Faculty of Engineering & Industrial Technology (FEIT)
 Faculty of Computer Science & Multimedia (FCSM)
 Faculty of Architecture & Build Environment (FABE)
 Faculty of Biotechnology (FBT) since 2005
 Faculty of Optometry (FOP) since 2004
 Faculty of Nursing & Health Science (FNHS) since 2007
 Faculty of Business & Finance (FBF)
 Faculty of Music, Media & Performing Arts (FMPA)
 Faculty of Education (FED)
 Centre of Language & Malaysian Studies (CLMS)
 Twintech Business School (TBS)
 Ocean Institute of Audio Technology (OIAT)

References

External links
 Official website
 Ocean Institute of Audio Technology official website

Private universities and colleges in Malaysia
Colleges in Malaysia
Universities and colleges in Selangor
Educational institutions established in 1994
1994 establishments in Malaysia